Richard L. Biddle (born November 26, 1947) is a former American football player and coach. He served as head football coach at Colgate University from 1996 through 2013, compiling a record of 137–73.  This ranks him first at Colgate in terms of total wins and he has achieved the best winning percentage of any Colgate coach with seven or more years at the helm of the Raiders.

Playing career
Biddle was an all-Atlantic Coast Conference linebacker for two seasons at Duke. The former Blue Devil co-captain received third team Associated Press All-America honors in his senior year and was a participant in the Blue-Gray and Hula Bowl games. Biddle was a three-time winner of Duke's Hatchet Award, given to the most valuable player on defense. In his senior year he also received the Blue Devil Club Award as the senior who contributed the most to the team. He is a member of the All-Century Team at Duke.

After going undrafted in the 1971 NFL Draft, Biddle signed with the Montreal Alouettes of the Canadian Football League (CFL) on May 3, 1971. He was released before the start of the regular season on June 23, 1971. Biddle signed with the Youngstown Hardhats of the Midwest Football League in 1972. He broke his leg in the eleventh game of the season, and missed the rest of the year.

Coaching career
Biddle worked as a graduate assistant for West Virginia in 1971 after his release from the Alouettes.

Biddle is the first Colgate coach to ever record nine straight seasons with seven or more victories.  In 2012, he led the Raiders to the Patriot League title and the NCAA FCS Playoffs (first round loss to Wagner). Overall, he led Colgate to seven Patriot League Championships (1997, 1999, 2002, 2003, 2005, 2008, and 2012).

Biddle retired after the 2013 season and was succeeded by Dan Hunt.

Head coaching record

References

1947 births
Living people
American football linebackers
Allegheny Gators football coaches
Colgate Raiders football coaches
Duke Blue Devils football players
Minnesota Golden Gophers football coaches
Montreal Alouettes players
Navy Midshipmen football coaches
Players of American football from West Virginia
Sportspeople from Parkersburg, West Virginia
Virginia Tech Hokies football coaches